Coleophora chretieni is a moth of the family Coleophoridae. It is found on Sardinia and Corsica.

References

chretieni
Moths described in 1979
Moths of Europe